is a Japanese mobile game created by Aniplex and Walt Disney Japan. Yana Toboso, creator of Black Butler, is in charge of the original plan, main script, and character design, which are inspired by Disney Villains from various franchises. An official English localization was released on January 20, 2022 in United States and Canada.

Gameplay
The genre of Disney Twisted-Wonderland is described as a "Villains Academy ADV (adventure game)". It is described to have a "basic gameplay system" consisting of three main elements: Lessons, Stories, and Tests.

Twisted Wonderland operates a gacha game model that allows you to obtain new characters to play with through utilizing the in-game currency of Magic Gems. The characters you obtain can be leveled by having them attend "Lessons.". Players are able to test the strength of their characters through tests (available daily), or exams (available periodically). Players place their characters in battle to score points depending on their team's strength. Players then achieve a rank depending on their point score, with higher ranks giving higher rewards.

A new system function was introduced to the Japanese version of the game on May 30, 2022, called the Guest Room. It allows players to freely customize and enjoy the “Guest Room” of the Ramshackle dorm, while inviting their favorite characters to come visit.

Plot
Yu, whose name can also be chosen by the player, is summoned to another world by a magic mirror and arrives at the magic training school, Night Ravens College. The main character is taken in by the school's headmaster and becomes acquainted with the school's top students, each in seven different dormitories, while searching for a way home.

Prologue: Welcome to the Villains' world 
The player is summoned to another world by a magic mirror and arrives at the magic training school, Night Raven College. The player has no recollection of how they were summoned, and in order to find a way to return to their original world, they are forced to live in the academy as an errand boy in the run-down dormitory, Ramshackle Dorm. Grim, Ace, and Deuce cause some troubles resulting in the three of them being expelled from the school, but they were told that if they cleared a certain condition, their expulsion would be revoked. Along the way, the player discovers that they have the ability to make the uncooperative students of the school cooperate, and Crowley asks the player to become a student of the school while sharing their status with Grim as a pair.

Book 1: The Rose-Red Tyrant 
On the night that the player and Grim are admitted to the school, Ace shows up with a magic-sealing collar on his neck, asking to stay the night. When asked about the situation, Ace replied that he angered his Housewarden by eating the tarts that were supposed to be for a party tomorrow, and that as punishment, he was collared. The next day, he promised to apologize to his Housewarden and heads to the Heartslabyul dormitory when trouble stirs.

Book 2: The Usurper from the Wilds 
The player learns that a sports tournament will be held at the school. Crowley tells Grimm, who wants to participate, that he will allow it if the player and Grim investigate and resolve the recent series of incidents where participants have been mysteriously injured. The player agrees and cooperates with the members of the Heartslabyul Dormitory to find the culprit.

Book 3: The Merchant from the Depths 
When the final exam scores were announced, the player and Jack were skeptical that the trio of Grim, Ace, and Deuce all got decent results. At that moment, sea anemones spring out from the top of the threes' heads, as well as from other students around, and everyone is dragged away somewhere. Following the three, the player and Jack arrive at the Octavinelle Dormitory where all students, including Grim, Ace, and Deuce, who signed a contract with the dormitory manager, Azul, were forced to work like slaves. In order to help the trio and the other contracted students, the player signs a contract with Azul.

Book 4: Schemer of the Scalding Sands 
As the holidays begin, the students of Night Raven College are returning home for the winter break. With no place to return to, the player and Grim remain at the school where Crowley asks them to watch over the school's heating system. One day, attracted by the delicious smell coming from the school's kitchen, the player finds Jamil, the Vice-Warden of the Scarabia dormitory, cooking. Jamil tells the player and Grim that the Scarabia dormitory received bad results on the final exams and thus, was remaining at school during the holidays to study. Jamil invites the player to come to Scarabia, where they are met with tensions between the Housewarden and Vice-Warden.

Book 5: A Beautiful Tyrant 
The new semester has begun and the player, who has gotten used to their daily life, is surprised that the National Arcane Academy Culture Fair is happening at the school. Students were encouraged to audition for the fair's main event, the "Vocal & Dance Championship", and Ace, Deuce, and Grim were determined to be chosen with the aim of the grand prize. They were taught how to dance by Kalim and Jamil, and passed the audition held at Pomefiore. Together with Vil and the others, they partake intensive training to win the championship.

Book 6: Keeper of the Underworld 
The player is attacked by Grim, who suddenly went out of control, and consults with Ace and Deuce to look for him together. A few days later, the members who participated in the VDC are gathered by Vil at Ramshackle dorm. Vil apologizes to Ace and the others for what happened at VDC and compensates them. Meanwhile, a mysterious armed group invades the school and kidnaps Vil, Jamil, Riddle, Leona, Azul, Crowley, and Grim. It turns out that the armed group is a special magical security force called "Charon" owned by the mysterious non-governmental organization "STYX", and Idia, who was the heir to the Shroud family, is the acting director of STYX.

Characters

Heartslabyul
The characters in the house are based on the Queen of Hearts and her cards from Alice in Wonderland.

A 17-year old sophomore and current Housewarden of Heartslabyul, having earned his title in his first week at Night Raven College. His fanatical devotion to the Queen of Hearts' rules - and his ability to enforce them - makes him feared across campus.
He is inspired by the Queen of Hearts from Alice in Wonderland.

A 16-year old freshman and one of the first friends the game's protagonist made, along with fellow Heartslabyul freshman Deuce. A quick learner with an upbeat personality and a mischievous streak. Since he and Deuce are both Heartslabyul freshmen in the same class, they regard one another with amicable antagonism.
His name is a reference to the ace playing card and the Trappola card game. Among the Heartslabyul cast, he represents the hearts suit.

A 16-year old freshman and one of the first friends the game's protagonist made, along with fellow Heartslabyul freshman Ace. An earnest young man who enrolled at Night Raven College with the singular aim of becoming a respectable mage. He tries as hard as he can in his schoolwork, but he can be slow on the uptake, and his grades suffer as a result.
His name is a reference to the deuce playing card and the spades suit.

An 18-year old junior and the Vice Housewarden of Heartslabyul. A mild-mannered person, he acts as a parental figure for the dorm's students, and is frequently left to smooth things over when Riddle's strictness gets out of hand.
His name is a reference to the number 3 and the clovers/clubs suit. 

An18-year old junior. Casual and carefree, this expert room-reader is often called on to mediate between others. He's always on top of the latest trends, and has an exhaustive familiarity with social media in all its forms, particularly Magicam (Night Raven College's main social media).
His name is a reference to the number 4 and the diamonds suit.

Savanaclaw
The characters in the house are based on Scar from The Lion King.

A 20-year old junior and Housewarden of Savanaclaw. Perpetually effort-averse, his immense magical ability contrasts with his lazy demeanor. Given his position as the secondborn prince in his homeland, he treats others with an imperious attitude.
He is inspired by Scar from The Lion King.

A 16-year old freshman. A stern student focused on self-betterment. He's the kind of misfit who hates acting buddy-buddy with others, but still respects the pecking order.

A 17-year old sophomore. A long-suffering runt who spends most of his time cleaning up Leona's messes, both literally and figuratively. Raised in a poor environment, he gets downright shameless when it comes to food.
He is inspired by the hyenas Shenzi, Banzai and Ed from The Lion King.

Octavinelle
The characters in the house are based on Ursula and her eels from The Little Mermaid.

A 17-year old sophomore and Housewarden of Octavinelle. He runs a café named the Mostro Lounge on campus and makes it a point to gather information in all forms. His benevolent demeanor belies an extremely calculating personality.
He is inspired by Ursula from The Little Mermaid.

A 17-year old sophomore. Vice Housewarden of Octavinelle and twin brother to Floyd. He is soft-spoken and courteous to everyone he deals with.
He is inspired by the eel Jetsam from The Little Mermaid.

A 17-year old sophomore. Twin brother to Jade. His mood swings make it hard to predict what he'll say or do next. He likes to call others by odd, fish-related pet names (e.g. Goldfish for Riddle).
He is inspired by the eel Flotsam from The Little Mermaid.

Scarabia
The characters in the house are based on Jafar from Aladdin.

A 17-year old sophomore and Housewarden of Scarabia. Born into vast wealth, he is a generous boy who always has a smile on his face. He's grown up with Jamil since a young age, and considers him a brother in all but blood.
He is inspired by the Sultan from Aladdin.

A 17-year old sophomore and Vice Housewarden of Scarabia. Born into a family that has served Kalim's family for generations, he has spent the better part of his childhood and later life being subjected to Kalim's carefree whims.
He is inspired by Jafar from Aladdin.

Pomefiore
The characters in the house are based on the Evil Queen from Snow White and the Seven Dwarfs.

An 18-year old junior and Housewarden of Pomefiore. A young man of striking beauty, he considers himself the fairest of all. No effort is too much for him in his unending pursuit of beauty.
He is inspired by the Evil Queen from Snow White and the Seven Dwarfs.

A 16-year old freshman. A dainty boy with an ephemeral beauty. Quiet, he gives off a mysterious air and distances himself a bit from others in his orbit.
His name is a reference to the poisoned apple used to poison Snow White in Snow White and the Seven Dwarfs.

An 18-year old junior and Vice Housewarden of Pomefiore. An appreciator of sublime aesthetics, he holds Vil and Epel's beauty in high regard. He can be a bit hard to read, though.
He is inspired by the Huntsman from Snow White and the Seven Dwarfs.

Ignihyde
The characters in the house are based on Hades from Hercules.

Idia Shroud is a recluse who gets incredibly anxious dealing with others. He is very skilled with technology development, writing the computer programs for and creating a robot brother, Ortho.
He is loosely inspired by Hades from the Hercules movie.

Ortho is a robot. He is portrayed as significantly younger than the majority of the cast, but no exact age is given.

Diasomnia
The characters in the house are based on Maleficent from Sleeping Beauty.

Night Raven College Staff

The Headmaster of Night Raven College. 

A tanuki-like creature who serves as the player character's companion through the duration of the game. 

The Alchemy teacher of Night Raven College.
Divus is inspired by Cruella de Vil from One Hundred and One Dalmatians.

The Magic History teacher of Night Raven College.
Mozus Trein is inspired by Lady Tremaine from Cinderella.

The Physical Education coach at Night Raven College.
Ashton is inspired by Gaston from Beauty and the Beast.

The owner of “Mr. S’s Mystery shop” at Night Raven College.
Sam is inspired by the villain Dr. Facilier from the movie The Princess and the Frog.

Other Schools

Royal Sword Academy 
Che'nya (チェーニャ, Chēnya)

 Voiced by: Hama Kento
 A junior at Royal Sword Academy and Riddle and Trey's childhood friend.
 Che'nya is inspired by the Cheshire Cat from Alice in Wonderland.

Neige LeBlanche (ネージュ・リュバンシェ, Nējyu Ryubanshe)

 Voiced by: Nagatsuka Takuma
 A sophomore at Royal Sword Academy that is a popular actor loved by the public.
 Neige is inspired by Snow White from Snow White and the Seven Dwarfs.

Noble Bell College 
The school is based on the story of The Hunchback of Notre Dame.

Rollo Flamme (ロロ・フランム, Roro Furanmu)

 Voiced by: Hiroshi Kamiya
 A junior and the student council president at Noble Bell College.
 Rollo is inspired by Judge Claude Frollo from The Hunchback of Notre Dame.

Development
Aniplex announced they were producing the game in collaboration with Walt Disney Japan at Anime Japan 2019. Yana Toboso, the creator of Black Butler, was credited for the concept, scenario, and character designs.

Disney Twisted-Wonderland was officially released for play on Android and iOS in Japan on March 18, 2020. The game's opening movie is animated by Troyca and the theme song, "Piece of my world", was performed by Night Ravens.

Other media

Manga
A manga adaptation, titled Disney Twisted-Wonderland The Comic: Episode of Heartslabyul, written by Wakana Hazuki and illustrated by Sumire Kowono, was serialized in Square Enix's Monthly G Fantasy magazine from March 18, 2021, to October 18, 2022. It has been collected in three tankōbon volumes.

A second manga adaptation, titled Disney Twisted-Wonderland The Comic: Episode of Savanaclaw, written and illustrated by Suzuka Oda, began serialization in the same magazine on December 18, 2022.

Anime
In October 2021, an anime adaptation was announced. Disney+ also licensed the anime at the same time.

Novel 
A novel adaptation, titled Disney Twisted-Wonderland Episode 1: Shinku no Bо̄kun (The Crimson Tyrant), written by Jun Hioki, was released on March 18, 2022.

Reception
Approximately 1 million users downloaded the game upon release.

References

External links
 

2020 video games
2021 manga
Android (operating system) games
Anime based on video games
Disney video games
Gangan Comics manga
IOS games
Manga based on video games
Music video games
Shōnen manga
Video games developed in Japan